Alan M. Sontag (born May 2, 1946) is an American professional bridge player. He won six world championships, including two Bermuda Bowl wins. Sontag is also known for his book The Bridge Bum, a book "on everybody's list of the top ten bridge books ever written."

Bridge career

Besides the two Bermuda Bowls, his other victories are the Rosenblum Cup, Transnational Open Teams, Senior Bowl, numerous North American Bridge Championships, and two wins in the London Sunday Times and Cavendish Invitational Pairs.
In 1973, he and Steve Altman became the first American players to win the Sunday Times Pairs, at the time the premier invitational tournament in the world. Two years later, Sontag returned to London and won the tournament again, this time with Peter Weichsel, with whom he formed one of the strongest partnerships in the world from the 1970s until 2005. The two were partners in the 1983 Bermuda Bowl tournament in Stockholm, when the United States defeated Italy in one of its most exciting final matches. Sontag returned to the final in 2001, in Paris, where team captain Rose Meltzer became the first woman to win the Bermuda Bowl. Meltzer teams including Sontag won the odd-years Senior Bowl in 2005 and 2007 and the open Rosenblum Cup in 2006. (During this time Weichsel and Kyle Larsen have been Meltzer's partners in international competition.)

Sontag was inducted into the ACBL Hall of Fame in 2007.

Personal

Sontag was born in New York City. He and his wife, Robin, live in Gaithersburg, Maryland, with their son Robert.

Widely regarded as one of the fastest players in the world, he is known by his nickname Sonty.

Bridge accomplishments

Honors
 ACBL Hall of Fame, 2007

Awards
 John E. Simon Award (Sportsman of the Year) 1974

Wins
 Bermuda Bowl (2) 1983, 2001
 Rosenblum Cup (1) 2006
 World Transnational Open Teams (1) 2000
 Senior Bowl (2) 2005, 2007
 North American Bridge Championships (16)
 Vanderbilt (3) 1972, 1988, 1999
 Spingold (3) 1980, 1982, 2000
 Reisinger (1) 1973
 Grand National Teams (1) 1994
 Open Board-a-Match Teams (1) 2001
 Men's Board-a-Match Teams (2) 1971, 1979
 North American Men's Swiss Teams (2) 1985, 1987
 Master Mixed Teams (1) 1989
 Life Master Pairs (1) 1977
 Life Master Men's Pairs (1) 1971
 United States Bridge Championships (3)
  Open Team Trials (2) 1982, 1991
 Senior Team Trials (1) 2004
 Other notable wins:
 Generali Two Worlds Trophy (1) 1994
 Lancia Challenge Match (1) 1975
 Lancia Swiss Teams (1) 1975
 Reisinger Knockout Teams (2) 1977, 1988
 Sunday Times Invitational Pairs (2) 1973, 1975
 Cavendish Invitational Pairs (2) 1976, 1977

Runners-up
 North American Bridge Championships (18)
 Vanderbilt (5) 1975, 1981, 1983, 1989, 1997
 Spingold (5) 1984, 1991, 1996, 1997, 2003
 Reisinger (3) 1992, 1996, 1998
 Men's Board-a-Match Teams (1) 1985
Mitchell Board-a-Match Teams (1) 2017
 Jacoby Open Swiss Teams (1) 2000
 Life Master Pairs (2) 1972, 1984
 United States Bridge Championships (5)
  Open Team Trials (4) 1972, 1974, 1980, 1999
 Senior Team Trials (1) 2007
 Other notable 2nd places:
 Buffett Cup (1) 2008
 Reisinger Knockout Teams (1) 1978
 Goldman Pairs (1) 1976

Books
The Bridge Bum: My Life and Play, Morrow, 1977, 
Power Precision: A Revolutionary Bridge System from a World Champion Player, Morrow, 1979 , 
Championship Bridge: One No Trump Forcing No. 20, Bibliagora, 1982, 
Improve Your Bridge - Fast, Robert Hale Pub Co, 1982 (with Peter Steinberg), 
The Viking Precision Club: A Relay System for the 21st Century, 2000 (with Glenn Grøtheim)
The Bridge Bum: My Life and Play, 2nd Edition, Master Point Press, 2003,

References

External links

  – with video interview

 

1946 births
American contract bridge players
Bermuda Bowl players
Contract bridge writers
Writers from New York City
People from Gaithersburg, Maryland
Living people